Geralius is a genus of beetles in the family Buprestidae, containing the following species:

 Geralius furciventris (Chevrolat, 1838)
 Geralius inermis Cobos, 1988

References

Buprestidae genera